The first season of the Romanian reality talent show Vocea României premiered on September 27, 2011 on ProTV and was hosted by Pavel Bartoș and Roxana Ionescu, while Vlad Roșca was the social media correspondent. Horia Brenciu, Loredana Groza, Smiley and Marius Moga were the coaches for the first season. Each coach was allowed to mentor twelve contestants. The winner was Ștefan Stan from Team Smiley.

The season finale aired on December 26, 2011. It immediately proved to be a hit for ProTV and the network renewed the show for a second season.

Overview 
The series consists of three phases: a blind audition, a battle phase and live performance shows. Four coaches, all famous musicians, choose teams of contestants through a blind audition process. Each coach has the length of the auditioner's performance (about two minutes) to decide if they want that singer on their team; if two or more coaches want the same singer, then the singer gets to choose their coach.

Contestant auditions were held on June 26 and 27, 2011, at Hotel Crown Plaza Bucharest. Contestants were also allowed to submit online applications.

Teams
 Color key

Blind auditions 
Color key

Episode 1 (September 27) 
The first of five pre-recorded audition episodes aired on Tuesday, September 27, 2011. The show started with the four coaches singing Queen's "Don't Stop Me Now".

Episode 2 (October 4) 
The second episode aired on October 4, 2011.

Episode 3 (October 11) 
The third episode aired on October 11, 2011.

Episode 4 (October 18) 
The fourth episode aired on October 18, 2011.

Episode 5 (October 25) 
The fifth and last blind audition episode was aired on October 25, 2011.

The battles 
After the blind auditions, each coach had twelve contestants for the battle rounds that aired from November 1 to November 15, 2011. Coaches began narrowing down the playing field by training the contestants with the help of "trusted advisors". Each episode featured seven or eight battles consisting of pairings from within each team, and each battle concluding with the respective coach eliminating one of the two contestants.

The trusted advisors for these episodes are: Monica Anghel working with Horia Brenciu, Dana Dorian working with Loredana Groza, Alex Velea working with Smiley and Randi working with Marius Moga

Color key

Episode 6 (1 November)
The sixth episode aired on November 1, 2011.

Episode 7 (8 November)
The seventh episode aired on November 8, 2011.

Episode 8 (15 November)
The eighth episode aired on November 15, 2011.

* Lavinia Vâlcan withdrew from the contest (see #Controversies); as a result, Anthony Icuagu, Gabriel Tran and Marcel Lovin formed a trio for the battle rounds.

The sing-off 
At the end of the battle rounds, each coach advanced four contestants from their team to the live shows, leaving the other two to duel for the fifth and last spot, in an extra round called "the sing-off" (cântecul decisiv). The contestants sang their blind audition songs again and the coaches chose one contestant each.

Color key:

Live shows 
Color key

Week 1 (November 22) 
Team Brenciu and Team Smiley competed in the first live show, which aired on November 22. From each team, viewers could save two contestants, while the coach could save one of the remaining three. The other two went on to the sing-off (cântecul decisiv), where they performed their songs for the night once again, after which one was eliminated by their coach.

Week 2 (November 29)
Team Loredana and Team Moga competed in the second live show, which aired on November 29. Public voting (by phone calls and text messages) commenced at this point. From each team, viewers could save two contestants, while the coach could save one of the remaining three. The other two went on to the sing-off (cântecul decisiv), where they performed their songs for the night once again, after which one was eliminated by their coach.

Week 3 (6 & 9 December) 
The third week comprised episodes 11 and 12. Team Brenciu and Team Smiley competed in the first part of this week, which aired on Tuesday, December 6, while Team Loredana and Team Moga competed in the second part of this week, which aired on Friday, December 9. Voting proceeded as before, except the public vote could only save one contestant from each team. Voting proceeded as before, except the public vote could only save one contestant from each team.

Week 4  (13 & 16 December) 
The fourth week comprised episodes 13 and 14. All remaining contestants performed in both live shows. Voting proceeded as before, except the third-placed contestant in each team was automatically eliminated, without going through the sing-off round.

Semi-final (December 16) 
All eight remaining contestants performed in the semi-final on Friday, December 16, 2011. Within each team, the coach and the viewers each had a 50/50 say; the contestant with the highest combined score went on to the final.

Week 5: Final (December 26) 
The top 4 contestants performed in the grand final on Monday, December 26, 2011. This week, the four finalists performed a solo song, a duet with a famous singer and a duet with their coach. The public vote determined the winner, and that resulted in a victory for Ștefan Stan, Smiley's first victory as a coach.

Elimination chart 
Color key
Artist info

Controversies 
Lavinia Vâlcan, a contestant in Team Smiley, withdrew from the contest before the battle round, as she considered that the show didn't allow her to express herself as an artist. Vâlcan claimed that, for the battle round, she had been forced to choose between two songs that did not suit her. The artist stated that the producers were uninterested in receiving a third proposal from her.

Ratings 

 Note: The figures above are approximations and they only represent viewers from urban areas.

External links 
 Official Vocea României website

References 

2011 Romanian television seasons